SNE may refer to:

Group SNE, a Japanese company
Jagoi language (ISO 639-3: sne), a language of Borneo
Sony Corporation (formerly NYSE: SNE, now SONY)
Southern New England Railway
Synthetic natural environment
Supernovae (abbreviated SNe)